The Pensacola 200 presented by Inspectra Thermal Solutions is a  annual ARCA Menards Series East race held at Five Flags Speedway in Pensacola, Florida. The event has been part of the ARCA Menards Series and ARCA Menards Series East (previously the NASCAR K&N Pro Series East) schedules and has come and gone from both throughout its history. It was originally held from 1992 to 1996 in what was then known as the ARCA Bondo/Mar-Hyde Series, brought back in 2013 and 2014 as an East Series race, brought back in 2019 as an ARCA Menards Series race, and then moved back to the East Series after NASCAR's acquisition of ARCA.

Sammy Smith is the defending winner of this race.

History

Past winners

ARCA Menards Series

ARCA Menards Series East

2020: Race extended due to a green-white-checker finish.

References

External links
 

1992 establishments in Florida
2013 establishments in Florida
2019 establishments in Florida
ARCA Menards Series East